"Headlights" is a song by American rapper Eminem, featuring American singer Nate Ruess of the band Fun. It was written by Eminem, Emile Haynie, Jeff Bhasker, Luis Riesto, and Ruess, while being produced by the former three. In the song, Eminem apologizes to his mother, Debbie Mathers, for criticizing her in his earlier songs and for showing scorn and resentment towards her in the past. It was released on February 5, 2014, as the album's fifth and the final single. It peaked at number 45 on the  Billboard Hot 100.

Background and composition 

Eminem had a difficult relationship with his mother since childhood. In his music, Eminem dissed her on various songs, including his breakthrough hit, "My Name Is", "Role Model", "Kill You", "My Mom", "Without Me", "Marshall Mathers", "Criminal", and most notably "Cleanin' Out My Closet." "Headlights" is an apology to his mother for the years of insults and "his plea for a united (or at least less dysfunctional) family." The title "Headlights" is a reference to their last meeting. As she drove away, he became fixated on the headlights of her car as he coped with feelings of "overwhelming sadness." He admits to his recklessness with lyrics directed towards his mom in the very first line, not really knowing his words would hurt her that much. In the song, Eminem references a few incidences from their rocky relationship, getting kicked out of the house on Christmas Eve, constant fighting, and his younger brother Nathan's removal to foster care. He also expresses regret that he has never let his mother be involved in his children's lives. In the song he acknowledges that his mother wrongfully endured the brunt of the blame for his tough upbringing and even gives her credit for her efforts to raise him as a single parent. Eminem admits that he remains estranged from his mother to this day. He also states that he cringes when he hears "Cleanin' Out My Closet" on the radio and he no longer performs it at shows.

In an interview with Sway Calloway, Eminem stated that, "everything he wanted to address" in regard to his mother is on "Headlights" and he likely will not speak on the topic outside of that particular song. He also told Zane Lowe that;

Recording
"Headlights" was produced by Emile and Jeff Bhasker, with additional production by Eminem and additional keyboards by Luis Resto. The song was written by Eminem, Nate Ruess, Emile Haynie, Jeff Bhasker, and Luis Resto. Recording for the song was done at Effigy Studios in Ferndale, Michigan by Mike Strange, Joe Strange and Tony Campana. The song's intro, bridge, and refrain is sung by Fun.'s lead singer Nate Ruess.

Critical reception
"Headlights" was met with generally positive reviews from music critics. Julie Leconte of Now said: "The track's genius partially lies in the anticipatory tension it creates in the listener. Em loves to set us up with faux sentimentality, then laugh when we’re duped. But on 'Headlights' the shoe never drops, leaving us with really sad insight into their non-relationship." Colin McGuire of PopMatters said that the song "gives us quite possibly the most touching moment Em has ever put on wax".

DJ Booth stated that "even though the hook on 'Headlights', by Fun's Nate Ruess, is light and airy exactly where it should have been deep, the raw and crushingly emotional lyrics from Eminem, especially ones that put an end to his running feud with his mother, are more than powerful enough to make 'Headlights' remarkable". Andy Gill of The Independent also praised the track, calling it "an almost shockingly apologetic love-letter to the mother he once denigrated so viciously". Edna Gundersen of USA Today stated that "it's an admirable confession" but "a so-so track".

Music video
The music video was filmed in Detroit, Michigan on April 5, 2014, and directed by Academy Award winning film director Spike Lee. It was released on May 11, 2014, Mother's Day in the United States. The video takes a non-chronological look at the turbulent relationship from his mother's perspective. This music video, running at 4 minutes and 10 seconds, uses the shortened version, in which Ruess' first chorus before Eminem's first verse, and the bridge (containing the lines from both Eminem and Ruess) before the end of its album version, are omitted.

Track listing

Notes
 signifies an additional producer.

Charts

Weekly charts

Year-end charts

Certifications

Release history

References

External links

Eminem "Headlights " lyrics

2014 singles
2013 songs
Eminem songs
Indie pop songs
Interscope Records singles
Music videos directed by Spike Lee
Song recordings produced by Emile Haynie
Song recordings produced by Eminem
Song recordings produced by Jeff Bhasker
Songs about mothers
Songs written by Emile Haynie
Songs written by Eminem
Songs written by Jeff Bhasker
Songs written by Nate Ruess
Torch songs